The Girl King is a 2015 biographical drama about Christina, Queen of Sweden. It was directed by Mika Kaurismäki and written by Michel Marc Bouchard who, after writing the screenplay for the film, wrote his stage play Christine, La Reine-Garçon which enjoyed a successful run in 2012 at Montreal's Théâtre du Nouveau Monde and then in English at the Stratford Festival in 2014.  The film premiered at the Montreal World Film Festival.

Cast
 Malin Buska as Kristina
 Sarah Gadon as Countess Ebba Sparre
 Michael Nyqvist as Chancellor Axel Oxenstierna
 Lucas Bryant as Count Johan Oxenstierna
 Laura Birn as Countess Erika Erksein
 Hippolyte Girardot as Ambassador Pierre Hector Chanut
 Peter Lohmeyer as Bishop Of Stockholm
 François Arnaud as Karl Gustav Kasimir
 Martina Gedeck as Maria Eleonora
 Patrick Bauchau as René Descartes

Reception

Critical response 
The film has received divided acclaim. At Rotten Tomatoes, the film has a rating of 42%, based on 19 reviews and an average rating of 4.81/10. 
Dana Piccoli at AfterEllen stated: "Anytime we get to see a story about queer women in history is a good thing, and The Girl King is certainly an interesting look at this enigmatic ruler. While I wish it could have been a bit stronger in its delivery, it’s still a very watchable film."

Awards 
The film won two awards at the Montreal World Film Festival, Best Actress to Malin Buska, and Most Popular Canadian Feature Film to director Mika Kaurismäki. It also won best Best Film at the Valladolid International Film Festival

References

External links
 

2015 films
Films directed by Mika Kaurismäki
Finnish drama films
Finnish LGBT-related films
English-language Finnish films
English-language Canadian films
Canadian drama films
Canadian LGBT-related films
Biographical films about Swedish royalty
2015 LGBT-related films
LGBT-related drama films
Films set in Sweden
Films set in the 17th century
Cultural depictions of Christina, Queen of Sweden
Cultural depictions of René Descartes
2015 drama films
2010s Canadian films